Cyphosticha albomarginata is a moth of the family Gracillariidae. It is known from the Northern Territory and Queensland of Australia.

References

Gracillariinae
Moths described in 1862